Limonium narbonense is a species of sea lavender belonging to the family Plumbaginaceae.

Synonyms 
Limonium angustifolium (Tausch) Degen
Limonium angustifolium (Tausch) Turrill
Limonium serotinum (Rchb.) Erben, nom. illeg.
Limonium serotinum (Rchb.) Pignatti
Limonium vulgare subsp. angustifolium (Tausch) P. Fourn.
Limonium vulgare subsp. serotinum (Rchb.) Gams
Statice angustifolia Tausch
Statice brunii Guss.
Statice limonium subsp. aggregata (Rouy) Rouy
Statice limonium subsp. angustifolia (Tausch) Rouy
Statice limonium subsp. serotina (Rchb.) Nyman
Statice serotina Rchb.

Description

The leaves are 12 to 30 inches long, lanceolate-spatulate, located in a basal rosette. The inflorescence is large, with only a few or absent sterile branches. The flowers are white to pale violet, with a calyx of about 5–7 mm. The flowering period extends from June to September.

Distribution and habitat
This species can be found in Southern Europe, North Africa and in Southwest Asia. It is a plant of Mediterranean coastal habitat such as beaches, salt marshes, and coastal prairie, and other sandy saline habitats.

Bibliography
Conti F.,Abbate G.,Alessandrini A.,Blasi C., 2005 -An Annoted Checklist of the Italian Vascular Flora. Roma
Pignatti S. 1982 -Flora d'Italia. Bologna
 Palop-Esteban, Segarra-Moragues J, González-Candelas F.

References

narbonense
Taxa named by Philip Miller
Flora of Lebanon